The term Diocese of Canada may refer to:

 Serbian Orthodox Diocese of Canada, Canadian diocese of the Serbian Orthodox Church
 Serbian Orthodox Diocese of America and Canada, former diocese (1921-1963) of the Serbian Orthodox Church, in the US and Canada
 Serbian Orthodox Diocese of Eastern America and Canada, former diocese (1963-1983) of the Serbian Orthodox Church, in eastern USA and Canada
 Free Serbian Orthodox Diocese of America and Canada, former diocese (1963-1991) of the "Free Serbian Orthodox Church", in USA and Canada
 Diocese of America and Canada (Metropolitanate of New Gračanica), former diocese (1991-2009) of the Serbian Orthodox Metropolitanate of New Gračanica
 Romanian Orthodox Diocese of Canada, Canadian diocese of the Romanian Orthodox Church
 Russian Orthodox Diocese of Montreal and Canada, Canadian diocese of the Russian Orthodox Church Outside Russia
 Ukrainian Orthodox Diocese of Central Canada, one of dioceses of the Ukrainian Orthodox Church of Canada
 Ukrainian Orthodox Diocese of Eastern Canada, one of dioceses of the Ukrainian Orthodox Church of Canada
 Ukrainian Orthodox Diocese of Western Canada, one of dioceses of the Ukrainian Orthodox Church of Canada
 Macedonian Orthodox Diocese of America and Canada, a diocese of the Macedonian Orthodox Church
 Armenian Diocese of Canada (Cilicia), Canadian diocese of the Armenian Apostolic Church, under the Holy See of Cilicia
 Assyrian Diocese of Canada, Canadian diocese of the Assyrian Church of the East

See also
Christianity in Canada
Eparchy of Canada (disambiguation)